RNN or rnn may refer to:

 Random neural network, a mathematical representation of an interconnected network of neurons or cells which exchange spiking signals
 Recurrent neural network, a class of artificial neural networks where connections between nodes form a directed graph along a temporal sequence
rnn (software)
 Recursive neural network, a kind of deep neural network created by applying the same set of weights recursively over a structured input
 WRNN-TV, branded as Regional News Network, a television station licensed to New Rochelle, New York, United States
 Rassd News Network, Egypt 
 Reserva Natural Nacional, national park in Colombia
 IATA code for Bornholm Airport, Denmark
 rnn, ISO 639-3 code for the Roon language